Ancelin Gourjault (born 31 October 1996) is a French male canoeist who won six medals at senior level at the Wildwater Canoeing World Championships.

Medals at the World Championships
Senior

References

External links
 

1996 births
Living people
French male canoeists
Place of birth missing (living people)